Seh Qaleh (also Romanized as Seh Qal‘eh; also known as Seh Kaleh) is a city in and the capital of Seh Qaleh District, in Sarayan County, South Khorasan Province, Iran. At the 2016 census, its population was 4,436, in 1,290 families.

References 

Populated places in Sarayan County

Cities in South Khorasan Province

tr:Seh Kale bahşı